The upper valley of the Mira River, called the Chota River in its upstream portion, in northern Ecuador, and the small villages in it are usually referred to as 'El Chota', and it runs east–west between the two ranges of the Andes. It lies in the provinces of Imbabura, Carchi and (to the west) Esmeraldas. The river and its upper valley are situated about halfway between the equator and the Colombian border. Accessed off Route 35, the nearest major city is Quito, but Ibarra is the major market centre just south of the valley. It is reputed to be where the best soccer players in the country tend to be from.

In the only village actually named Chota, Spanish-speaking black Creole villagers live here but there are eleven other Afro-Ecuadorean villages with more than 100 inhabitants in the upper Chota; the Quechua-speaking farmers live higher up in the Andes mountains. Located beside the Chota River, the Chotans live from growing sugar cane, making aguardiente (brandy) and a range of other crops and raise pigs and goats. The valley bottom lies at around 1700 metres but the highway to the north and south rises quickly to over 3000 metres high.

The Chota valley people are of African descent. Most were brought here as slaves during the colonial period, particularly when many of the great sugar estates were owned and organised by the Jesuits. Esmeraldas, to the west, is the main African descendant area in the country. These people are supposedly descendants of slaves escaping from wrecked slave ships, just as is the African descendant population of the Choco in Colombia. Similar African descendant populations, occur in the hot valley south of Cuenca in southern Ecuador and, to the north in Colombia, in the Patía valley.

The Chota valley is somewhat culturally unique as a black settlement in Hispanic America located far from the lowlands. Afro-Bolivians are similarly located away from lowland areas.

The climate in the upper Chota valley can be hot or cool, but is consistently dusty. The valley bottom is dry (around 1000 mm.annually) and temperatures range between 16 and 29 degrees Celsius. As the valley descends towards the coast is passes through cloud forest and is more humid. Annual flooding and landslides are a dangerous problem in the rainy season.  Homes are simple and most are one room only. They are made of cinder blocks or grass and reeds.

The Chota valley has recently become the site of much community tourism, in which travelers can live with families and experience the valley's culture.

Notable people
Jhon Minda, footballer

See also 
Afro-Ecuadorian people
Bomba (Ecuador)
Chota Valley dialect

References

Bibliography 
(Ref: permission of: Angelique, Stephen, Iceman Gone; Gibbs, James, "Japan Traveler" magazine)
 

Afro-Ecuadorian
Populated places in Carchi Province
Geography of Ecuador